Gordon McCauley (born 9 March 1972) is a New Zealand cyclist. He has won the men's New Zealand road race championships a record five times and the New Zealand time trial championships a record three times. He was also the first New Zealander to break the 50 minute barrier for the 40 km time trial, recording a time of 49 minutes 50 seconds at the 2006 Commonwealth Games in Melbourne, winning the bronze medal.

He is the only rider ever to hold New Zealand Road, Time Trial and Criterium Titles (although on different years).

In 2016 McCauley completed his 23rd Tour of Southland giving him the most completed tours beating 8 time winner Brian Fowler

Major results
Sources:

1996
 1st Overall Tour of Southland
 2nd National Road race championships
1997
 National Championships
1st  Road race
2nd Time trial
 1st Sprint classification Herald Sun Tour
1999
 1st Overall Girvan Three Day
 1st Overall British Premier Calendar 
 9th Manx Trophy
2000
 1st Grand Prix de la ville de Pérenchies
 3rd Internatie Reningelst
 7th Internationale Wielertrofee Jong Maar Moedig
2001
 1st Archer International Grand Prix
 1st Stages 3 & 4 Tour of Southland
 1st Ottersham
 1st Horton Cum Studley
 2nd Brussel-Ingooigem
 2nd Havant International GP
 3rd Belsele – Puivelde
 3rd Buggenhout
 7th Grand Prix Midtbank
2002
 National Championships
1st  Road race
1st  Time trial
 1st Stage 8 Tour of Southland
 1st Archer International Grand Prix
 1st Grote Prijs Marcel Kint
 1st Strombeek-Bever
 1st Jock Wadley Memorial RR
 1st Wanzele
 1st Zwevegem
 2nd Bochum
 3rd Grand Prix Midtbank
 3rd GP Fina – Fayt-le-Franc
 3rd Zottegem – Dr Tistaertprijs
 4th Henk Vos Memorial
2003
 1st  National Road Race Championships
 1st Dwars door het Hageland
 1st Stages 1 & 4 Tour of Southland
 1st Stages 8 & 11 International Cycling Classic
 1st Santa Barbara
 1st California Bicycle Racing Series
 1st New Plymouth
 1st Te Awamutu Open Road Race
 2nd Schwanendstadt 
 2nd Grote Paasprijs 
 2nd Lincoln International GP
 3rd Flachgauer Radsporttage
2004
 1st Stages 4 & 9 Tour of Southland
 1st Rodney Rabbit Ride
 1st Boulevard Road Race
 1st Stage 1 Tour de Temecula
 1st Nike Vision
 1st Captech Classic Richmond
 2nd Overall Valley of the Sun Stage Race
 3rd GP Steiermark
 3rd Walterboro
 3rd Boulder-Roubaix
 7th Overall New Zealand Cycle Classic
2005
 National Championships
1st  Road race
2nd Time trial
3rd Criterium
 Oceania Road Championships
1st  Road race
1st  Time trial
 1st  Overall Tour of Southland
 1st Overall Tour of Gippsland
 1st Overall Tour of Taranaki
1st Stages 1, 2, 3 & 5
 3rd Overall Tour of Tasmania
2006
 1st UCI Oceania Tour
 2nd Nevada City Classic
 2nd Lake Taupo Cycle Challenge
 2nd Culver
  Commonwealth Games Time Trial
 3rd La Mirada
 7th Overall Tour of Southland
1st Stage 4 
2007
 National Championships
1st  Criterium
2nd Time trial
3rd Road race
 Oceania Road Championships
1st  Time trial
 1st Blackpool
 1st Tour of Pendle
 1st Warwick
 2nd Tour of the Reservoir
 2nd Lincoln International GP
 3rd Overall Tour de Vineyards
1st Stages 1 & 2
 3rd Overall Girvan Three Day
 3rd British National Road Race Championships
 3rd Richmond GP
 3rd Colne GP
 8th Overall Tour of Wellington
1st Stages 1, 2 & 7 
2008
 1st Stage 1 Tour of Wellington
 1st The REV Classic
 Benchmark Homes Tour
1st Stages 2 & 4
 2nd Overall Tour of Southland
 3rd National Time trial championships
 3rd Auckland 1000
2009
 1st  National Road Race Championships
 1st The REV Classic
 1st Stage 6 Tour of Southland
 1st Round the Mountain Classic
 1st Taupo to Napier Classic
 4th Overall Tour of Hainan
2010
 1st  National Time Trial Championships
 1st Overall Tour of Tasmania
 3rd Overall Tour of the Murray River
2012
 Benchmark Homes Series
1st Hokitika & Tour of Selwyn
 1st Stage 5 Tour of Great South Coast
 1st Stage 10 Tour of the Murray River
2013
 1st Overall Tour of Taranaki
1st Stage 4
2014
 1st Silver Jersey Tour of Southland
 3rd Overall North Island Elite series
1st Round 1
2015
 1st Te Kawhauwata Cycle Challenge
 2nd National Club Nationals Open Men
2016
 1st Round one Dynamo masters series
 1st Stage one Tour of Northland
 1st Te Kwhauwata Cycle Challenge
2017
 1st World Masters Games 45-49 MTB
 1st World Masters Games Team Tri
 1st Waikato Road Race Champs 45-49
 1st Nduro 4 Hour MTB (open)
 2018
 1st Round the Mountain Cycle Challenge
 2019
 3rd Ruapehu Express MTB
 3rd Totara Park 6 Hour MTB 3rd (first Age group)
 4th Crank it at Craters MTB 
 8th Contact Epic MTB (first age group)
 21st Gravel Worlds Lincoln Nebraska
2020
 1st Round the Mountain Cycle Challenge
 2nd Te Kawahata Cycle Challenge

References

External links
 Gordon McCauley bio
 

Living people
1972 births
New Zealand male cyclists
Commonwealth Games bronze medallists for New Zealand
Cyclists at the 2006 Commonwealth Games
Cyclists at the 2010 Commonwealth Games
Sportspeople from Balclutha, New Zealand
Commonwealth Games medallists in cycling
Medallists at the 2006 Commonwealth Games